Allen Hill may refer to:
 Allen Hill (cricketer), English cricketer and umpire
 Allen Hill (scientist), professor of bioinorganic chemistry
 Allen Hill (physician), American physician and politician

See also
 Alan Hill (disambiguation)